was a Japanese samurai and scholar of kokugaku, known during his lifetime as an expert on ancient court ceremonial practices.

Biography
Tada Yoshitoshi was born in 1698 to a gokenin family affiliated with Tada Shrine in Settsu Province. He was allegedly a descendant of the Heian period warrior-aristocrat Tada Mitsunaka.

He studied Chinese literature as well as the Suika Shinto of Yamazaki Ansai under  at Osaka. Tada subsequently became an active teacher of court ceremony and Shinto studies in that city. Later, he travelled to Kyoto to participate in research under the scholar . However, he was expelled by Tsuboi after publishing an essay in which he questioned the credibility of the Kuji Hongi.

Before his death, Tada gained as a disciple  of Owari Domain. He died on October 12, 1750.

References 

1698 births
1750 deaths
Samurai
Kokugaku scholars
Japanese Shintoists
Japanese writers of the Edo period